The Honda Crosstourer (also called VFR1200X) is an adventure motorcycle made by Honda since 2012. It was announced  at the 2011 EICMA motorcycle show in Milan. The  V4 engine is a re-tuned version of the engine that was first used on the 2010 VFR1200F model. The fuel injection mapping, camshaft, and valve timing have all been revised to produce lower power than the VFR1200F, claimed by Honda to be  versus , but the power output is focused at lower and middle engine speeds.

The Crosstourer is equipped with either a conventional six-speed sequential manual transmission as fitted to most motorcycles, or a dual clutch transmission (DCT), which allows the rider to change gears manually without a clutch lever, or leave it to the gearbox to select the appropriate gear as an automatic transmission would. The DCT system is also used on the VFR1200F, the first use of DCT on any motorcycle. Like the VFR1200F, the Crosstourer uses a shaft final drive.

The Crosstourer was launched to compete in the adventure-touring market with the BMW R1200GS, the Yamaha XT1200Z Super Ténéré, and the Triumph Tiger Explorer.

References

External links 

Crosstourer
Motorcycles introduced in 2012
Shaft drive motorcycles